Brad Galli (born 1989 in Detroit, Michigan) is a sports anchor and reporter for WXYZ-TV in Detroit.

Career

Brad Galli is a sports anchor at WXYZ-TV in Detroit, Michigan. He regularly covers the Detroit Red Wings, Tigers, Lions, Pistons, as well as college and high school athletics. He is featured during the week on Action News at 5, 6, and 11 p.m. Galli can also be seen regularly with reports for the Sunday night 7 Sports Cave.

Brad was named Sportscaster of the Year in Michigan by the National Sports Media Association for 2018. He earned an Emmy in 2016 for Excellence in Sports Anchoring in Michigan by the National Academy of Television Arts and Sciences. He won his first Emmy in 2014 for Excellence in Sports Reporting. Brad was also nominated in 2012 and 2013.

He anchored WXYZ's 4 p.m. news program, called The Now Detroit, from 2014–15, before returning to the sports team to anchor.

During the 2017 and 2018 football seasons, Galli hosted Inside Michigan Football with Jim Harbaugh on IMG Radio, the school's official, weekly radio show.

Galli joined WXYZ in 2011, working with longtime WXYZ sports anchors Don Shane and Tom Leyden.

Personal life
Galli currently resides in Birmingham, Michigan, with his wife and children.

Education

High school
Galli graduated from Brother Rice High School (Michigan) in 2007 where he played football and was a part of the 2005 MHSAA State Championship team.

College
Galli graduated from Marquette University with a degree in communications and a minor in theology. He worked as the sports director at MUTV (Marquette University Television) for two years before graduating from the Milwaukee school in 2011.

He covered the Marquette basketball team and created the popular show, Marquette Basketball Weekly, that drew over 30,000 views in two seasons. It is the most watched show in Marquette University Television history. Galli introduced ESPN basketball analyst Chris Broussard at a College of Communication Axthelm lecture in April 2011, and led a panel of discussion after the lecture.

In 2012, he returned to Marquette to serve as the emcee of the men's basketball banquet.

References

External links
Brad on Twitter
WXYZ Staff Bio

American television sports announcers
Marquette University alumni
1989 births
Living people
People from Troy, Michigan
People from Beverly Hills, Michigan
Brother Rice High School (Michigan) alumni